George Warne (1792 -  29 October 1868) was a blind organist and composer based in England.

Life

Born in 1792, he was noted as holding a number of organists posts despite being blind.

He died in Bath on 29 October 1868.

Appointments
Organist of St Helen's Bishopsgate 1819 - 1820
Organist of St Magnus-the-Martyr 1820 - 1826
Organist of Temple Church 1826 - 1843
Organist of St. Nicholas Church, Great Yarmouth 1843 - 1856

Compositions

He composed
Grand March and Finale for the Piano Forte
Home Sweet Home, arranged with Variations
Set of psalm tunes, as sung at the Temple Church, London [1838] .
Songs : Broken gold ; Come away to the grotto ; Evening song ; bring me my harp ; We meet again in heaven. 
Quadrilles, galops, and other music for the pianoforte

References

1792 births
1868 deaths
English organists
British male organists
English composers
Blind classical musicians
19th-century English musicians
19th-century British male musicians
19th-century organists